The 2015–16 New York Rangers season was the franchise's 89th season of play and their 90th season overall. The season began its regular games on October 7, 2015 against the Chicago Blackhawks.

Regular season
 On November 15, the Rangers beat the Toronto Maple Leafs to extend their winning streak to nine:  the second-longest in franchise history.  Additionally, the win surpassed eight-game winning streaks that occurred in the 2014–15 season and the 1974–75 season.
 On January 16, Henrik Lundqvist recorded his 20th victory of the season, making him the first NHL goaltender to start his career with 11 straight, 20-win seasons.  Lundqvist also joined Hockey Hall of Fame member Tony Esposito and retired goaltender Martin Brodeur as the only goalies with 11 consecutive, 20-win seasons at any point in their career. Overall, Lundqvist became the 15th NHL netminder to have won at least 20 games in a season 11 times.
 On February 14, Lundqvist became the Rangers' all-time leader in games played by a goaltender.  He surpassed Mike Richter with his 667th career appearance in a 3-1 home win over the Philadelphia Flyers.

Standings

Schedule and results

Pre-season

|- style="background:#cfc;"
| 1 || September 21 || New Jersey Devils || 6–3 || 1–0–0
|- style="background:#fcc;"
| 2 || September 22 || @ Philadelphia Flyers || 3–5 || 1–1–0
|- style="background:#fff;"
| 3 || September 24 || @ Boston Bruins || 3–4 (SO) || 1–1–1
|- style="background:#cfc;"
| 4 || September 26 || @ New Jersey Devils || 4–3 || 2–1–1
|- style="background:#cfc;"
| 5 || September 28 || Philadelphia Flyers || 3–2 (OT) || 3–1–1
|- style="background:#cfc;"
| 6 || September 30 || Boston Bruins || 3–2 || 4–1–1
|-

Regular season

|- style="background:#cfc;"
| 1 || October 7 || @ Chicago || 3–2 ||  || Lundqvist || United Center || 22,104 || 1–0–0 || 2 || Recap
|- style="background:#cfc;"
| 2 || October 9 || @ Columbus || 4–2 ||  || Lundqvist || Nationwide Arena || 19,027 || 2–0–0 || 4 || Recap
|- style="background:#cfc;"
| 3 || October 10 ||  Columbus || 5–2 ||  || Lundqvist || Madison Square Garden || 18,006 || 3–0–0 || 6 || Recap
|- style="background:#fcc;"
| 4 || October 13 ||  Winnipeg || 1–4 ||  || Lundqvist || Madison Square Garden || 18,006 || 3–1–0 || 6 || Recap
|- style="background:#fcc;"
| 5 || October 15 ||  @ Montreal || 0–3 ||  || Lundqvist || Bell Centre || 21,288 || 3–2–0 || 6 || Recap
|- style="background:#fff;"
| 6 || October 18 ||  New Jersey || 1–2 || OT || Lundqvist || Madison Square Garden || 18,006 || 3–2–1 || 7 || Recap
|- style="background:#cfc;"
| 7 || October 19 || San Jose || 4–0 ||  || Raanta || Madison Square Garden || 18,006 || 4–2–1 || 9 || Recap
|- style="background:#cfc;"
| 8 || October 22 || Arizona || 4–1 ||  || Lundqvist || Madison Square Garden || 18,006 || 5–2–1 || 11 || Recap
|- style="background:#fff"
| 9 || October 24 ||  @ Philadelphia || 2–3 || SO || Lundqvist|| Wells Fargo Center || 19,805 || 5–2–2 || 12 || Recap
|- style="background:#cfc"
| 10 || October 25 ||  Calgary || 4–1 || || Raanta || Madison Square Garden || 18,006 || 6–2–2 || 14 || Recap
|- style="background:#cfc;"
| 11 || October 30 || Toronto || 3–1 ||  || Lundqvist || Madison Square Garden || 18,006 || 7–2–2 || 16 || Recap
|-

|- style="background:#cfc;"
| 12 || November 3 ||  Washington || 5–2 ||  || Lundqvist || Madison Square Garden || 18,006 || 8–2–2 || 18 || Recap
|- style="background:#cfc;"
| 13 || November 6 || @ Colorado || 2–1 ||  || Lundqvist || Pepsi Center || 17,818 || 9–2–2 || 20 || Recap
|- style="background:#cfc;"
| 14 || November 7 || @ Arizona || 4–1 ||  || Raanta || Gila River Arena || 13,029 || 10–2–2 || 22 || Recap
|- style="background:#cfc;"
| 15 || November 10 ||  Carolina || 3–0 ||  || Lundqvist || Madison Square Garden || 18,006 || 11–2–2 || 24 || Recap
|- style="background:#cfc;"
| 16 || November 12 ||  St. Louis || 6–3 ||  || Lundqvist || Madison Square Garden || 18,006 || 12–2–2 || 26 || Recap
|- style="background:#cfc;"
| 17 || November 14 || @ Ottawa || 2–1 || SO || Lundqvist || Canadian Tire Centre || 20,006 || 13–2–2 || 28 || Recap
|- style="background:#cfc;"
| 18 || November 15 ||  Toronto || 4–3 ||  || Raanta || Madison Square Garden || 18,006 || 14–2–2 || 30 || Recap
|- style="background:#fcc;"
| 19 || November 19 || @ Tampa Bay || 1–2 ||  || Lundqvist || Amalie Arena || 19,092 || 14–3–2 || 30 || Recap
|- style="background:#cfc;"
| 20 || November 21 || @ Florida || 5–4 || OT || Lundqvist || BB&T Center || 17,866 || 15–3–2 || 32 || Recap
|- style="background:#cfc;"
| 21 || November 23 ||  Nashville || 3–0 ||  || Lundqvist || Madison Square Garden || 18,006 || 16–3–2 || 34 || Recap
|- style="background:#fcc;"
| 22 || November 25 || Montreal || 1–5 ||  || Lundqvist || Madison Square Garden || 18,006 || 16–4–2 || 34 || Recap
|- style="background:#fcc;"
| 23 || November 27 || @ Boston || 3–4 ||  || Lundqvist || TD Garden || 17,565 || 16–5–2 || 34 || Recap
|- style="background:#fcc;"
| 24 || November 28 ||  Philadelphia || 0–3 ||  || Raanta || Madison Square Garden || 18,006 || 16–6–2 || 34 || Recap
|- style="background:#cfc;"
| 25 || November 30 ||  Carolina || 4–3 ||  || Lundqvist || Madison Square Garden || 18,006 || 17–6–2 || 36 || Recap
|-

|- style="background:#fff"
| 26 || December 2 || @ NY Islanders || 1–2 || SO || Lundqvist || Barclays Center || 15,795 ||  17–6–3 || 37 || Recap
|- style="background:#fcc;"
| 27 || December 3 ||  Colorado || 1–2 ||  || Raanta || Madison Square Garden || 18,006 || 17–7–3 || 37 || Recap
|- style="background:#cfc;"
| 28 || December 6 || Ottawa || 4–1 ||  || Lundqvist || Madison Square Garden || 18,006 || 18–7–3 || 39 || Recap
|- style="background:#fcc;"
| 29 || December 9 || @ Vancouver || 1–2 ||  || Lundqvist || Rogers Arena || 18,195 || 18–8–3 || 39 || Recap
|- style="background:#fcc;"
| 30 || December 11 || @ Edmonton || 5–7 ||  || Raanta || Rexall Place || 16,836 || 18–9–3 || 39 || Recap
|- style="background:#fff;"
| 31 || December 12 || @ Calgary || 4–5 || OT || Raanta || Scotiabank Saddledome || 19,289 || 18–9–4 || 40 || Recap
|- style="background:#cfc;"
| 32 || December 15 ||  Edmonton || 4–2 ||  || Lundqvist || Madison Square Garden || 18,006 || 19–9–4 || 42 || Recap
|- style="background:#fcc;"
| 33 || December 17 || @ Minnesota || 2–5 ||  || Lundqvist || Xcel Energy Center || 19,090 || 19–10–4 || 42 || Recap
|- style="background:#fcc;"
| 34 || December 18 || @ Winnipeg || 2–5 ||  || Lundqvist || MTS Centre || 15,294 || 19–11–4 || 42 || Recap
|- style="background:#fcc;"
| 35 || December 20 || Washington || 3–7 ||  || Lundqvist || Madison Square Garden || 18,006 || 19–12–4 || 42 || Recap
|- style="background:#cfc;"
| 36 || December 22 || Anaheim || 3–2 || OT || Lundqvist || Madison Square Garden || 18,006 || 20–12–4 || 44 || Recap
|- style="background:#fcc;"
| 37 || December 28 || @ Nashville || 3–5 ||  || Lundqvist || Bridgestone Arena || 17,317 || 20–13–4 || 44 || Recap
|- style="background:#cfc;"
| 38 || December 30 || @ Tampa Bay || 5–2 ||  || Lundqvist || Amalie Arena || 19,092 || 21–13–4 || 46 || Recap
|-

|- style="background:#fcc;"
| 39 || January 2 || @ Florida || 0–3 || || Lundqvist || BB&T Center || 20,289 || 21–14–4 || 46 || Recap
|- style="background:#cfc;"
| 40 || January 5 || Dallas || 6–2 ||  || Lundqvist || Madison Square Garden || 18,006 || 22–14–4 || 48 || Recap
|- style="background:#fff;"
| 41 || January 9 ||  Washington || 3–4 || OT || Lundqvist || Madison Square Garden || 18,006 || 22–14–5 || 49 || Recap
|- style="background:#cfc;"
| 42 || January 11 || Boston || 2–1 ||  || Lundqvist || Madison Square Garden || 18,006 || 23–14–5 || 51 || Recap
|- style="background:#fcc;"
| 43 || January 14 || @ NY Islanders || 1–3 ||  || Lundqvist || Barclays Center || 15,795 || 23–15–5 || 51 || Recap
|- style="background:#cfc;"
| 44 || January 16 || @ Philadelphia || 3–2 || SO || Lundqvist || Wells Fargo Center || 19,843 || 24–15–5 || 53 || Recap
|- style="background:#fcc;"
| 45 || January 17 || @ Washington || 2–5 ||  || Raanta || Verizon Center || 18,506 || 24–16–5 || 53 || Recap
|- style="background:#cfc;"
| 46 || January 19 || Vancouver || 3–2 || OT || Lundqvist || Madison Square Garden || 18,006 || 25–16–5 || 55 || Recap
|- style="background:#cfc;"
| 47 || January 22 || @ Carolina || 4–1 ||  || Lundqvist || PNC Arena || 14,102 || 26–16–5 || 57 || Recap
|- style="background:#fcc;"
| 48 || January 24 || @ Ottawa || 0–3 ||  || Lundqvist || Canadian Tire Centre || 18,940 || 26–17–5 || 57 || Recap
|- style="background:#cfc;"
| 49 || January 25 ||  Buffalo || 6–3 ||  || Lundqvist || Madison Square Garden || 18,006 || 27–17–5 || 59 || Recap
|-

|- style="background:#fcc;"
| 50 || February 2 || @ New Jersey || 2–3 ||  || Lundqvist || Prudential Center || 16,514 || 27–18–5 || 59 || Recap
|- style="background:#cfc;"
| 51 || February 4 || Minnesota || 4–2 ||  || Lundqvist || Madison Square Garden || 18,006 || 28–18–5 || 61 || Recap
|- style="background:#cfc;"
| 52 || February 6 || @ Philadelphia || 3–2 || SO || Lundqvist || Wells Fargo Center || 19,805 || 29–18–5 || 63 || Recap
|- style="background:#cfc;"
| 53 || February 8 || New Jersey || 2–1 ||  || Lundqvist || Madison Square Garden || 18,006 || 30–18–5 || 65 || Recap
|- style="background:#cfc;"
| 54 || February 10 || @ Pittsburgh || 3–0 || || Lundqvist  || Consol Energy Center || 18,539 || 31–18–5 || 67 || Recap
|- style="background:#fff;"
| 55 || February 12 || Los Angeles || 4–5 || OT || Raanta || Madison Square Garden || 18,006 || 31–18–6 || 68 || Recap
|- style="background:#cfc;"
| 56 || February 14 || Philadelphia || 3–1 ||  || Lundqvist || Madison Square Garden || 18,006 || 32–18–6 || 70 || Recap
|- style="background:#fcc;"
| 57 || February 17 ||  Chicago || 3–5 ||  || Lundqvist || Madison Square Garden || 18,006 || 32–19–6 || 70 || Recap
|- style="background:#cfc;"
| 58 || February 18 || @ Toronto || 4–2 ||  || Raanta || Air Canada Centre || 18,952 || 33–19–6 || 72 || Recap
|- style="background:#cfc;"
| 59 || February 21 ||  Detroit || 1–0 || OT || Lundqvist || Madison Square Garden || 18,006 || 34–19–6 || 74 || Recap
|- style="background:#fcc;"
| 60 || February 23 || @ New Jersey || 2–5 ||  || Lundqvist || Prudential Center || 16,514 || 34–20–6 || 74 || Recap
|- style="background:#cfc;"
| 61 || February 25 || @ St. Louis || 2–1 ||  || Lundqvist || Scottrade Center || 17,524 || 35–20–6 || 76 || Recap
|- style="background:#cfc;"
| 62 || February 27 || @ Dallas || 3–2 ||  || Lundqvist || American Airlines Center || 18,532 ||36–20–6 || 78 || Recap
|- style="background:#cfc;"
| 63 || February 29 || Columbus || 2–1 ||  || Raanta || Madison Square Garden || 18,006 || 37–20–6 || 80 || Recap
|-

|- style="background:#fcc;"
| 64 || March 3 || @ Pittsburgh || 1–4 ||  || Lundqvist || Consol Energy Center || 18,492 || 37–21–6 || 80 || Recap
|- style="background:#cfc;"
| 65 || March 4 || @ Washington || 3–2 ||  || Raanta || Verizon Center || 18,506 || 38–21–6 || 82 || Recap
|- style="background:#fcc;"
| 66 || March 6 || NY Islanders || 4–6 ||  || Raanta || Madison Square Garden || 18,006 || 38–22–6 || 82 || Recap
|- style="background:#cfc;"
| 67 || March 8 || @ Buffalo || 4–2 ||  || Raanta || First Niagara Center || 19,070 || 39–22–6 || 84 || Recap
|- style="background:#fff;"
| 68 || March 12 || @ Detroit || 2–3 || OT || Lundqvist || Joe Louis Arena || 20,027 || 39–22–7 || 85 || Recap
|- style="background:#fcc;"
| 69 || March 13 ||  Pittsburgh || 3–5 ||  || Lundqvist || Madison Square Garden || 18,006 || 39–23–7 || 85 || Recap
|- style="background:#cfc;"
| 70 || March 16 || @ Anaheim || 2–1 ||  || Raanta || Honda Center || 15,400 || 40–23–7 || 87 || Recap
|- style="background:#fff;"
| 71 || March 17 || @ Los Angeles || 3–4 || OT || Lundqvist || Staples Center || 18,230 || 40–23–8 || 88 || Recap
|- style="background:#fcc;"
| 72 || March 19 || @ San Jose || 1–4 ||  || Lundqvist || SAP Center at San Jose || 16,888 || 40–24–8 || 88 || Recap
|- style="background:#cfc;"
| 73 || March 21 || Florida || 4–2 ||  || Lundqvist || Madison Square Garden || 18,006 || 41–24–8 ||  90 || Recap
|- style="background:#cfc;"
| 74 || March 23 || Boston || 5–2 ||  || Lundqvist || Madison Square Garden || 18,006 || 42–24–8 || 92 || Recap
|- style="background:#cfc;"
| 75 || March 26 || @ Montreal ||5–2 ||  || Raanta || Bell Centre || 18,604  || 43–24–8 || 94 || Recap
|- style="background:#fff;"
| 76 || March 27 || Pittsburgh || 2–3 || OT || Lundqvist || Madison Square Garden || 18,006 || 43–24–9 || 95 || Recap
|- style="background:#fcc;"
| 77 || March 31 || @ Carolina || 3–4 ||  || Lundqvist || PNC Arena || 16,336 || 43–25–9 || 95 || Recap
|-

|- style="background:#fcc;"
| 78 || April 2 ||  Buffalo || 3–4 ||  || Raanta || Madison Square Garden || 18,006 || 43–26–9 || 95 || Recap
|- style="background:#cfc;"
| 79 || April 4 || @ Columbus || 4–2 ||  || Lundqvist || Nationwide Arena || 15,951 || 44–26–9 || 97 || Recap
|- style="background:#cfc;"
| 80 || April 5 || Tampa Bay || 3–2 ||  || Lundqvist || Madison Square Garden || 18,006 || 45–26–9 || 99 || Recap
|- style="background:#fcc;"
| 81 || April 7 ||  NY Islanders || 1–4 ||  || Lundqvist || Madison Square Garden || 18,006 || 45–27–9 || 99 || Recap
|- style="background:#cfc;"
| 82 || April 9 || Detroit || 3–2 ||  || Raanta || Madison Square Garden || 18,006 || 46–27–9 || 101 || Recap
|-

|-
|

Playoffs

The Rangers qualified for the playoffs for the sixth consecutive season, entering as the fourth seed in the Eastern Conference and being matched up against the Pittsburgh Penguins.

|- style="background:#fcc;"
| 1 || April 13 || @ Pittsburgh Penguins || 2–5 || Raanta (0–1) || Penguins lead 1–0
|- style="background:#cfc;"
| 2 || April 16 || @ Pittsburgh Penguins ||  4–2 || Lundqvist (1–0)  || Series tied 1–1
|- style="background:#fcc;"
| 3 || April 19 || Pittsburgh Penguins || 1–3 || Lundqvist (1–1) || Penguins lead 2–1
|- style="background:#fcc;"
| 4 || April 21 || Pittsburgh Penguins || 0–5 || Lundqvist (1–2) || Penguins lead 3–1
|- style="background:#fcc;"
| 5 || April 23 || @ Pittsburgh Penguins || 3–6 || Lundqvist (1–3) || Penguins win series 4–1
|-

|-
|

Player statistics
Final stats
Skaters

Goaltenders

†Denotes player spent time with another team before joining the Rangers. Stats reflect time with the Rangers only.
‡Denotes player was traded mid-season. Stats reflect time with the Rangers only.
Bold/italics denotes franchise record.

Awards and honors

Awards

Milestones

Records

Transactions
The Rangers were been involved in the following transactions during the 2015–16 season:

Trades

Notes
 Carolina to retain 50% ($4.125 million) of salary as part of trade.
 Conditional on Yandle signing with the Panthers.

Free agents acquired

Free agents lost

Claimed via waivers

Lost via waivers

Lost via retirement

Player signings

Draft picks

Below are the New York Rangers' selections at the 2015 NHL Entry Draft, held on June 26–27, 2015 at the BB&T Center in Sunrise, Florida.

Draft notes
 The New York Rangers' first-round pick went to the New York Islanders as the result of a trade on June 26, 2015 that sent Edmonton's second-round pick in 2015 (33rd overall) and Florida's third-round pick in 2015 (72nd overall) to Tampa Bay in exchange for  this pick. Tampa Bay previously acquired this pick as the result of trade on March 5, 2014 that sent Martin St. Louis and a conditional second-round pick in 2015 to New York in exchange for Ryan Callahan, a conditional first-round pick in 2014, a conditional seventh-round pick in 2015 and this pick.
  The Florida Panthers' second-round pick went to the New York Rangers as the result of a trade on June 27, 2015 that sent Carl Hagelin and a second and sixth-round pick in 2015 (59th and 179th overall) to Anaheim in exchange for Emerson Etem and this pick. Anaheim previously acquired this pick as the result of a trade on June 26, 2015 that sent Kyle Palmieri to New Jersey in exchange for a third-round pick in 2016 and this pick. New Jersey previously acquired this pick as the result of a trade on February 26, 2015 that sent Jaromir Jagr to Florida in exchange for a conditional third-round pick in 2016 and this pick.
 The New York Rangers' second-round pick went to the Anaheim Ducks as the result of a trade on June 27, 2015 that sent Emerson Etem and Florida's second-round pick in 2015 (41st overall) to New York in exchange for Carl Hagelin, a sixth-round pick in 2015 (179th overall) and this pick.
  The Buffalo Sabres' third-round pick went to the New York Rangers as the result of a trade on June 27, 2015 that sent Montreal's second-round pick in 2015 (57th overall) to Washington in exchange for and a fourth-round pick in 2015 (113th overall) and this pick. Washington previously acquired this pick as the result of a trade on March 5, 2014 that sent Michal Neuvirth and Rostislav Klesla to Buffalo in exchange for Jaroslav Halak and this pick.
  The Ottawa Senators' third-round pick went to the New York Rangers as the result of a trade on June 27, 2015 that sent Cam Talbot and a seventh-round pick in 2015 (209th overall) to Edmonton in exchange for Montreal's second-round pick in 2015 (57th overall), a seventh-round pick in 2015 (184th overall) and this pick. Edmonton previously acquired this pick as the result of a trade on March 5, 2014 that sent Ales Hemsky to Ottawa in exchange for a fifth-round pick in 2014 and this pick.
  The Washington Capitals' fourth-round pick went to the New York Rangers as the result of a trade on June 27, 2015 that sent Montreal's second-round pick in 2015 (57th overall) to Washington in exchange for and Buffalo's third-round pick in 2015 (62nd overall) and this pick.
 The New York Rangers' fifth-round pick went to the Vancouver Canucks as the result of a trade on March 5, 2014 that sent Raphael Diaz to New York in exchange for this pick.
 The New York Rangers' sixth-round pick went to the Anaheim Ducks as the result of a trade on June 27, 2015 that sent Emerson Etem and Florida's second-round pick in 2015 (41st overall) to New York in exchange for Carl Hagelin, a second-round pick in 2015 (59th overall) and this pick.
  The Edmonton Oilers' seventh-round pick went to the New York Rangers as the result of a trade on June 27, 2015 that sent Cam Talbot and a seventh-round pick in 2015 (209th overall) to Edmonton in exchange for Montreal's second-round pick in 2015 (57th overall), the Ottawa Senators' third-round pick (79th overall) and this pick.

References

External links
 Winning Streaks In New York Professional Sports

New York Rangers seasons
New York Rangers
New York Rangers
New York Rangers
New York Rangers
 in Manhattan
Madison Square Garden